The BAZ-6909 is a Russian artillery tractor and missile vehicle that was developed as a successor to the MAZ-537 and MAZ-7310 by Bryansk Automobile Plant. It can haul semi-trailers and loads with mass of 13-21 metric tons, both on and off-road.

It uses a YaMZ-8424.10 diesel engine with 500 hp.

Variants 
 BAZ-6402 6x6 tractor truck;
 BAZ-69092 6x6 special wheeled chassis;
 BAZ-6306 8x8 artillery tractor;
 BAZ-6403 8x8 tractor truck;
 BAZ-6910 8x8 shelter carrier;
 REM-KS, 8x8 repair and recovery vehicle;
 BAZ-69069 10x10 special wheeled chassis;
 BAZ-69099 12x12 special wheeled chassis.

See also 
 KZKT-7428
 MAZ-543
 ZIL-135

References

External links

Military vehicles of Russia
Military trucks
Tank transporters
Artillery tractors
BAZ vehicles
Military vehicles introduced in the 1990s